Astrid Bekkenes (born 5 July 1947) is a Norwegian politician for the Liberal Party.

She serves as a deputy representative to the Norwegian Parliament from Vest-Agder during the term 2005–2009. In total she met during 13 days of parliamentary session.

References

1947 births
Living people
Deputy members of the Storting
Liberal Party (Norway) politicians
Politicians from Kristiansand
Women members of the Storting
Place of birth missing (living people)
21st-century Norwegian women politicians
21st-century Norwegian politicians